Dam Sefidar (also Romanized as Dam Sefīdār; also known as Dam Sepīdār) is a village in Sepidar Rural District, in the Central District of Boyer-Ahmad County, Kohgiluyeh and Boyer-Ahmad Province, Iran. At the 2006 census, its population was 75, in 17 families.

References 

Populated places in Boyer-Ahmad County